The 2014 Vuelta a España took place between 23 August and 14 September 2014 and was the 69th edition of the race. It featured eight mountain stages, five hill stages, five flat stages, and three time trials (one team and two individual), two of which appeared at the beginning and end of the race. Jerez de la Frontera, on the Spanish south coast, hosted the opening stage. The Vuelta then went counterclockwise, through the south-east and east of the country before crossing the north and finishing in Santiago de Compostela. This was the first time in 21 years that the race has finished outside Madrid.

Contador went into the race uncertain of his form after crashing out of the Tour on the 10th stage, breaking his tibia. However, Contador found his form in the race earlier than expected, taking the red jersey on the 10th stage individual time trial and taking two key mountain stage wins on his way to victory. Like Contador, Froome also went into the race uncertain of his form after he crashed three times in two days during the Tour, leading to his withdrawal. However, Froome came to life during the third week, finishing second in three key mountain stages and taking time to move into second place overall. Spanish rider Alejandro Valverde of the  completed the podium, finishing 40 seconds behind Froome and 1 minute and 50 seconds behind Contador. Valverde also took the sixth stage of the race going to La Zubia, the race's first mountain stage.

In the race's other classifications, John Degenkolb of  won the green jersey for the points classification. Degenkolb took four stage wins, the most by any rider in the race. Aside from taking the red jersey, Contador also won the white jersey for the combination classification. He took the first place in the general classification, third place in the points classification and second place in the mountains classification.  took the team classification for accumulating the lowest time from their three best cyclists.

Teams

The 18 UCI World Tour teams were automatically entitled to start the race; four wildcard teams were also invited.

†: Invited UCI Pro Continental teams

Pre-race favourites
Before the start of the race, defending champion, Chris Horner, 2014 Giro d'Italia champion Nairo Quintana, Joaquim Rodríguez and Alejandro Valverde were among the favourites for overall victory. After abandoning the Tour de France, Chris Froome and Alberto Contador announced they would compete in the Vuelta. Other possible contenders could emerge from Wilco Kelderman, Carlos Betancur, Fabio Aru, Thibaut Pinot, Ryder Hesjedal, Rigoberto Urán, Andrew Talansky and Dan Martin.

The day before the Vuelta began, Chris Horner was withdrawn from the race due to low levels of cortisol. This is because Lampre Merida are part of the Mouvement pour un cyclisme crédible (MPCC) which forbids cyclists from racing when cortisol concentrations drop below a specified threshold. On stage 11, Nairo Quintana withdrew from the race after crashing twice in two days.

Route and stages

Classification leadership table
There were four main classifications contested in the 2014 Vuelta a España, with the most important being the general classification. The general classification was calculated by adding each cyclist's finishing times on each stage. The cyclist with the least accumulated time was the race leader, identified by the red jersey; the winner of this classification was considered the winner of the Vuelta. In 2014, there were time bonuses given on mass-start stages; ten seconds were awarded to the stage winner, with six for second and four for third.

Additionally, there was a points classification, which awards a green jersey. In the points classification, cyclists get points for finishing among the best in a stage finish, or in intermediate sprints. The cyclist with the most points led the classification, and is identified with a green jersey. There was also a mountains classification. The organisation categorised some climbs as either Categoria Especial, first, second or third category; points for this classification were won by the first cyclists that reach the top of these climbs, with more points available for the higher-categorised climbs. The cyclist with the most points led the classification, and was identified with a blue polka dot jersey.

The fourth individual classification was the combination classification, marked by the white jersey. This classification is calculated by adding the numeral ranks of each cyclist in the general, points and mountains classifications – a rider must have a score in all classifications possible to qualify for the combination classification – with the lowest cumulative total signifying the winner of this competition.

For the team classification, the times of the best three cyclists per team on each stage were added; the leading team is the team with the lowest total time. For the combativity award, a jury gives points after each stage to the cyclists they considered most combative. The cyclist with the most votes in all stages leads the classification. For the daily combative winner, the rider in question donned a dossard with a red background, on the following stage.

Notes
 In Stage 4 Danilo Wyss, who was second in the combination classification, wore the white jersey, because Lluís Mas (in first place) wore the blue polka-dot jersey as leader of the mountains classification during that stage.
 In Stage 5, John Degenkolb, who was second in the points classification, wore the green jersey, because Michael Matthews (in first place) wore the red jersey as leader of the general classification during that stage.
 In Stages 7–9, Chris Froome, who was second in the combination classification, wore the white jersey, because Alejandro Valverde (in first place) wore the red jersey as leader of the general classification during that stage.
 In Stage 16, Joaquim Rodríguez, who was third in the combination classification, wore the white jersey, because Alejandro Valverde (in first place) wore the blue polka-dot jersey as leader of the mountains classification during that stage, while Alberto Contador (in second place) wore the red jersey as leader of the general classification during that stage.
 In Stages 19–21, Alejandro Valverde, who was second in the combination classification, wore the white jersey, because Alberto Contador (in first place) wore the red jersey as leader of the general classification during that stage.

Classification standings

General classification

Points classification

King of the Mountains classification

Combination classification

Team classification

References

External links
 Official website
 2014 Vuelta a España at Cycling News
 All stages
 Vuelta 2014: downloadable special magazine

 
2014
2014 UCI World Tour
2014 in Spanish road cycling